is a Japanese talent and a member of the Japanese idol group Idoling!!!. She is represented by the Production Ogi talent agency. She attends Meiji Gakuin University. She was a member of the idol group "Doll's Vox" in 2005 with AKB48's Yuko Oshima, produced by The Alfee's Toshihiko Takamizawa. She is the first Idoling!!! member to release a solo single.

Discography

Singles 
1. "Walk My Way" (June 19, 2013)
2. "Your Voice, My Life" (October 9, 2013)
3.  (February 5, 2014)
4.  (June 18, 2014)
5.  (May 13, 2015)
6. "SHUT YOUR MOUTH!!!!!!" (December 16, 2015)

Albums 
1.  (March 19, 2014)
2.  (November 30, 2016)

Filmography

Movies
 Kenka Banchou Gekijoban ~ Ichinen Sensou (2011) as Ayano Shiratori
 Kotsu Tsubo (2012) as Mitsuko Akari

Dramas
 Kibo no Michi (2011) Tohoku Housou

TV shows 
 Idoling!!! (October 2006 – present) Fuji TV
 SDM Hatsu i (2004) Fuji TV
 CS Hatsu! Bishoujo Bako (2004–2005) Fuji TV CS
 Ruri Umeko Nandemo Yarimasu Ka??? (2010–present) Pigoo HD
 Shibuya LIVE! The Primeshow (2012–present) WOWOW

Image video 
 Four Seasons (October 23, 2009)
 Traveling (October 20, 2010)
 Coloring (December 16, 2011)
 Dateling!!! (October 31, 2012)

Bibliography

Photobooks
 Ruri Iro (November 27, 2008) 
 RURIKA 430days. (March 31, 2010)

References

External links 
 Official Production Ogi profile 
 Official blog 
 Idoling!!! Official Website - Fuji TV
 Idoling!!! Official Website - Pony Canyon

Japanese television personalities
Japanese idols
1991 births
Living people
Idoling!!! members
People from Kanagawa Prefecture
Musicians from Kanagawa Prefecture
Japanese people of Russian descent
CJ Victor Entertainment artists